Giuseppe de Lazzara (1626 – 2 March 1702) was a Roman Catholic prelate who served as Bishop of Alife (1676–1702).

Biography
Giuseppe de Lazzara was born in Rome, Italy in 1626. On 23 March 1676, he was appointed during the papacy of Pope Clement X as Bishop of Alife. On 19 April 1676, he was consecrated bishop by Gasparo Carpegna, Cardinal-Priest of San Silvestro in Capite, with Prospero Bottini, Titular Archbishop of Myra, and Giacomo Buoni, Bishop of Montefeltro, serving as co-consecrators. He served as Bishop of Alife until his death on 2 March 1702.

Episcopal succession
While bishop, Lazzara was the principal co-consecrator of:
Fabrizio Cianci, Bishop of Guardialfiera (1689);
Laurent Buti (Buzzi), Bishop of Carpentras (1691); and
Sebastiano Perissi, Bishop of Nocera de' Pagani (1692).

References

External links and additional sources
 (for Chronology of Bishops) 
 (for Chronology of Bishops) 

17th-century Italian Roman Catholic bishops
18th-century Italian Roman Catholic bishops
Bishops appointed by Pope Clement X
1626 births
1702 deaths